is a railway station in Isahaya, Nagasaki, Japan. It is operated by JR Kyushu and is served by the Nagasaki Main Line.

Lines

Station layout 
The station, which is unstaffed, consists of two side platforms serving two tracks on an embankment. Track 1 is a through-track while track 2 is a passing loop. There is no station building but shelters are provided on both platforms for waiting passengers. From the station entrance, a double flight of steps leads up the embankment to platform 1. Access to the opposite side platform is by means of a level crossing.

Adjacent stations

History
Japanese Government Railways (JGR) built the station in the 1930s during the development of an alternative route for the Nagasaki Main Line along the coast of the Ariake Sea. Higashi-Isahaya was opened on the same day as an intermediate station on this stretch of track. With through traffic achieved from Hizen-Yamaguchi on the new route to Nagasaki, the entire stretch of track was designated as part of the Nagasaki Main Line on 1 December 1934. With the privatization of Japanese National Railways (JNR), the successor of JGR, on 1 April 1987, control of the station passed to JR Kyushu.

Passenger statistics
In fiscal 2014, there were a total of 41,099 boarding passengers, giving a daily average of 112 passengers.

Surrounding area
National Route 207

See also
 List of railway stations in Japan

References

External links
Higashi-Isahaya Station (JR Kyushu)

Nagasaki Main Line
Railway stations in Nagasaki Prefecture
Railway stations in Japan opened in 1934